Xing Kai (born 8 January 1989) is a former Chinese footballer.

Career statistics

Club

Notes

References

1989 births
Living people
Chinese footballers
Association football defenders
Chinese Super League players
Shenzhen F.C. players
Xinjiang Tianshan Leopard F.C. players